Thomas Edward McManus (born July 30, 1970) is a former American Football Middle Linebacker for the Jacksonville Jaguars in the National Football League.

McManus began his career playing football in the fourth grade at St. Mary’s of Buffalo Grove, Illinois.  He played high school football at Wheeling High School in Wheeling, Illinois.

Following McManus’s high school career, he would go on to play football at Boston College under Head Coach Tom Coughlin.  Coughlin would later coach McManus in the NFL with the Jacksonville Jaguars. During McManus’s senior year at Boston College, he was a third-team All-American along with being a two time First-team All-Big East Linebacker.  McManus completed his Bachelor's Degree in Marketing.

He was signed as an Undrafted Free Agent by the New Orleans Saints in 1993, even though he played his entire career for the Jacksonville Jaguars. 

McManus currently resides in Jacksonville, Florida with his wife Kristina and their three children Avery, Kelsey and Harley. Kristina McManus is also a Jacksonville Jaguar Roar alumni. 

McManus hosts a TV & Radio sports and entertainment show called "Tom McManus Uncensored." The show airs 6-9am ET on Jacksonville's WFXJ (AM).   The television show airs weekly on WCWJ.

McManus has written a book titled, “We’ll Always Be Pals." The book describes his relationship with his father, Gene McManus, who despite a 50 year age difference, are best friends. Gene McManus died of cancer at age 75 in 1995.

External links
 McManus Uncensored

1970 births
Living people
People from Buffalo Grove, Illinois
Players of American football from Illinois
American football linebackers
Boston College Eagles football players
Jacksonville Jaguars players
Amateur radio people
American television personalities